Reutova is a rural locality in Katyrinsky Selsoviet Rural Settlement, Oktyabrsky District, Kursk Oblast, Russia. Population:

Geography 
The village is located in the Seym River basin (a left tributary of the Desna), 68 km from the Russia–Ukraine border, 20 km south-west of Kursk, 4 km south-west of the district center – the urban-type settlement Pryamitsyno, 2 km from the selsoviet center – Mitrofanova.

 Climate
Reutova has a warm-summer humid continental climate (Dfb in the Köppen climate classification).

Transport 
Reutova is located 14 km from the federal route  Crimea Highway (a part of the European route ), on the road of regional importance  (Kursk – Lgov – Rylsk – border with Ukraine), 1.5 km from the nearest railway halt 439 km (railway line Lgov I — Kursk).

The rural locality is situated 31.5 km from Kursk Vostochny Airport, 120 km from Belgorod International Airport and 233 km from Voronezh Peter the Great Airport.

References

Notes

Sources

Rural localities in Oktyabrsky District, Kursk Oblast